Vivian E. Browne (April 26, 1929–July 23, 1993) was an American artist. Born in Laurel, Florida, Browne was mostly known for her African-American protest paintings, and linking abstraction to nature. She has received multiple awards for her work, been an activist, professor and a founder of many galleries. According to her mother, Browne died at 64 from bladder cancer.

Biography
Vivian Browne was born in Laurel, Florida, on April 26, 1929. She spent most of her life in New York City and Kern County, California. She received her Bachelor of Science in 1950 from Hunter College, New York, NY and a Master of Fine Arts from Hunter College in 1959. Her early painting career was fostered by a scholarship from the New School for Social Research, and a Huntington Hartford Foundation fellowship in 1964 and a fellowship with the MacDowell Colony.

She was invested in her travels across Europe and Africa, also studying at the University of Ibadan in Nigeria in 1972. Browne worked at Rutgers University in Newark from 1971 to 1992 as a faculty member of the Arts and Sciences department while continuing as an artist in her own right with shows across the country.

Career 
Browne had multiple solo exhibitions at SoHo 20 Gallery during her lifetime, as well as exhibitions at the Bronx Museum, University of California, Santa Cruz and Western Michigan University. She also showed at MoMA PS1's space in the Clocktower Gallery in 1986.

In 2017, Browne was posthumously included in the exhibition We Wanted a Revolution: Black Radical Women, 1965–85, organized by the Brooklyn Museum. In 2018, her work was also shown in Acts of Art and Rebuttal in 1971, an exhibition at Hunter College that revisited the 1971 exhibition Rebuttal to the Whitney Museum Exhibition: Black Artists in Rebuttal organized by members of the  Black Emergency Cultural Coalition to protest the Whitney Museum’s refusal to appoint a Black curator for their survey Contemporary Black Artists in America. Browne had been considered for the Whitney's exhibition but was ultimately not included.

Collections
Browne's work is housed in public and private collections all over the United States, primarily in New York and California. Most notably her work can be found in the collections of the Smithsonian with the Robert Blackburn (artist) printmaking workshop, MOMA, the Schomburg Center NYC, Chase Manhattan Bank  the John Cotton Dana Library, the Hatch-Billops Collection, the Wadsworth Atheneum Museum, The New York Public Library  and the Harry Belafonte & Rosa Parks private collections. Browne is included in the Center for the Women in the Arts and Humanities virtual exhibit at Rutgers University.

Activism
Many of Browne's works, particularly those from the 1960s, showcase her dissatisfaction with the struggles of growing up as a disenfranchised black woman. "Black art is political. If it's not political, it's not black art". While she fought for equality, she was not optimistic about attitudes changing soon, and self categorized her look at art into two categories. "When I am political, I am painting as a black or as a woman or both. Otherwise, I am just a member of the human race." She taught the History of Black Art at Rutgers University, and served as chair of the department from 1975 to 1978.

Browne contributed to, and served as an advisor to, HERESIES: A Feminist Publication on Art and Politics, including serving on the editorial collective for issue #15, Racism is the Issue.

Major Achievements
In addition to serving as a professor and department chair at Rutgers, Browne was honored most notably for her political works showcasing her life as a black woman. She served as a Fulbright panelist in 1990, and spent much of her time in the 70s and 80s in exhibit curation and symposia. Her many experiences as a panelist include the 1971 NYC's Art Student's League's Symposium on Afro-American Art, the 1973, 1974 and 1976 National Conference of Artists and the NEA amongst others. She was also part of the Soho20 Chelsea, a Broome Street gallery. Additionally, she has been featured in over 80 group and solo exhibitions, including at the Museum of Modern Art (MoMA) and the Orlando Gallery and the Black Art Festival in Atlanta, Georgia.

Publications
 1998 SIGNS, Journal of Women in Culture and Society, Cover Illustration, published by the University of Chicago
 1998 African American Art, Oxford University Press pg.217
 1998 Not for Sale: Cat and Art in the USA During the 1970s, a video tape and book by Laura Cottingham, Hawkeye Productions, New York, NY
 1986 Heresies Magazine, Illustration, 15th Issue
 1985 Artists and Influences, Hatch Billops
 1980 Heresies Magazine, Illustration, 9th Issue
 1979 Heresies Magazine, Photo essay on China, 8th Issue
 1975 Ararat Magazine, 
 1973 Impressions, Contributor to: 8x10 Art Portfolio (1971–73), published by the Printmaking Workshop, New York, NY,
 1972 Attica Book
 1972 "Afro-American Art, Annotated Bibliography", published by the New York City Board of Education

Awards
Vivian Browne was the recipient of multiple awards throughout her life.
 Huntington Hartford Painting Fellowship, Pacific Palisades, CA, 1963
 Achievement Award, National Association of business and Professional Women
 Research Council Grants, Rutgers University, NJ
 MacDowell Colony Fellowship, Peterborough, NH	
 Visiting Artist, University of California at Santa Cruz, Santa Cruz, CA
 Artists and Influence, Hatch-Billops Collection, New York, NY
 Guest of Honor, New York Feminist Art Institute, Women's Center for Learning, New York, NY
 Distinguished Teacher of Art, College Art Association, New York, NY
 "Mayor Koch Honors Six Black Artists," City Hall, New York, NY, 1986

References

External links 
 The Crow’s Nest Studio and Gallery (Los Angeles). partial archives of Vivian E. Browne.
 Oral History interview of Vivian Browne conducted by Henri Ghent, for the Archives of American Art. (July 1, 1968)

African-American women artists
1993 deaths
1929 births
American expatriates in Nigeria
University of Ibadan alumni
Rutgers University faculty
Hunter College alumni
People from Sarasota County, Florida
Artists from New York City
American art educators
20th-century American artists
American women academics
20th-century American educators
African-American activists
African-American academics
20th-century American women educators
20th-century American women artists
20th-century African-American women
20th-century African-American people
20th-century African-American artists